Qiangba Puncog, also spelled Champa Phuntsok (born in May 1947) was the chairman of the government of Tibet Autonomous Region of China from 2003 until January 2010. He is of Tibetan ethnicity. He was most visible in public during the 2008 Tibetan unrest, receiving diplomats and journalists. Qiangba Puncog resigned as chairman on January 12, 2010, and subsequently began serving as chairman of the Standing Committee of the People's Congress of the Tibet Autonomous Region.

Biography 
Qiangba Puncog was born in Chamdo, Tibet in May 1947. He graduated from Chongqing University, and he joined in the Communist Party of China in 1974.

References 

1947 births
Living people
Chairperson and vice chairpersons of the Standing Committee of the 12th National People's Congress
Chinese Communist Party politicians from Tibet
Delegates to the 8th National People's Congress
Delegates to the 11th National People's Congress
People from Chamdo
People's Republic of China politicians from Tibet
Political office-holders in Tibet
Tibetan politicians